Karlče is a small settlement on the right bank of the Krka River in the Municipality of Kostanjevica na Krki in eastern Slovenia. The area is part of the traditional region of Lower Carniola. It is now included in the Lower Sava Statistical Region.

References

External links
Karlče on Geopedia

Populated places in the Municipality of Kostanjevica na Krki